Peter Bishop FRS (14 June 1917 — 3 June 2012) was an Australian neurophysiologist whose research involved study of the mammalian visual system.

He was elected Fellow of the Royal Society in 1977.

References 

1917 births
2012 deaths
Neurophysiologists
Fellows of the Royal Society
Australia Prize recipients